Zindagi Na Milegi Dobara (English: You Live Only Once) is a 2011 Indian coming-of-age film directed by Zoya Akhtar, who also co-wrote the film along with Reema Kagti. It is produced by Excel Entertainment. The film stars an ensemble cast of Hrithik Roshan, Abhay Deol and Farhan Akhtar, with Katrina Kaif and Kalki Koechlin in supporting roles. The musical score for the film was composed by the trio Shankar–Ehsaan–Loy. Its cinematography was provided by Carlos Catalan. The film narrates the story of three friends on a bachelor trip and how each of them discover themselves and overcome their problems and insecurities.

Rotten Tomatoes, a review aggregator, surveyed 7 reviews and judged 100 percent to be positive. The film garnered awards and nominations in several categories, with particular praise for its direction, screenplay, and the performances of its cast. As of 2015, the film has won 33 awards from 66 nominations.

At the 57th ceremony of the Filmfare Awards, Zindagi Na Milegi Dobara won awards in seven categories, including Best Film, Best Director (Zoya Akhtar), and Best Supporting Actor (Farhan Akhtar). The film garnered eleven nominations at the 18th Screen Awards ceremony, and received three awards, including Best Film. At the 13th Zee Cine Awards, it received four awards, including Best Supporting Actor. In the 13th iteration of the International Indian Film Academy Awards, the film was nominated for fourteen awards, going on to win nine, including Best Film, Best Director, and Best Supporting Actor. The film won two honours—Best Choreography and a Best Audiography prize for Baylon Fonseca—at the 59th ceremony of India's National Film Awards.

Accolades

See also 
 List of Bollywood films of 2011

Footnotes 
 Awards in certain categories do not have prior nominations and only winners are announced by the jury. For simplification and to avoid errors, each award in this list has been presumed to have had a prior nomination.
 Each date is linked to the article about the awards held that year, wherever possible.

References

External links 
 Accolades for Zindagi Na Milegi Dobara at the Internet Movie Database

Lists of accolades by Indian film